Desudaba is a genus of bugs in the family Fulgoridae, tribe Poiocerini and subtribe Calyptoproctina Metcalf, 1938.  Records are from Australia and New Guinea.

Species 
Fulgoromorpha Lists on the Web lists:
 Desudaba aulica Stål, 1869
 Desudaba circe (Stål, 1863)
 Desudaba danae (Gerstaecker, 1895)
 Desudaba insularis Schmidt, 1911
 Desudaba maculata Distant, 1892
 Desudaba meridionalis Lallemand, 1928
 Desudaba modesta Jacobi, 1928
 Desudaba psittacus Walker, 1858  type species - type species
 Desudaba scylla Distant, 1888

References 

Auchenorrhyncha genera
Poiocerinae